Ad-Dahi may refer to:

 Ad Dahi District, Yemen
 Ad-Dahi (Yemen)
 Ed-Dahi, Israel